Hadrianopolis or Hadrianoupolis was a town in ancient Phrygia, built by the emperor Hadrian, between Philomelium and Tyriaeum. It was a bishopric, whose bishop attended the Council of Chalcedon and the Second Council of Constantinople.

Its site is located near Doğanhisar in Asiatic Turkey.

References

Populated places in Phrygia
Former populated places in Turkey
Hadrian
Former Roman Catholic dioceses in Asia
Roman towns and cities in Turkey
History of Konya Province